Helgi Pálson Briem (June 18, 1902 – August 2, 1981) was an Icelandic diplomat.

In 1929 he was Director of Taxation.
From 1930 to 1932 he was Managing Director of the Fishery Bank of Iceland.
In 1932 he was Government Commercial Delegate.
In 1935 he was Commercial Attache in Madrid.
In 1937 he was Commercial Attache in Berlin.
In 1940 he was Commercial Attache in Lisbon.
From 1942 to 1948 he had Exequatur as Consul-General for New York City.
From 1948 to 1950 he was Chargé d'affaires in Stockholm.
From  to  he was Ambassador in Stockholm with coacdredition 30 January 1951 to 	11 September 1953 in Moscow 17 January 1951 to 1 July 1955 in Oslo and 29 April 1953 to 28 December 1960 in Belgrade.
From  to  he was Ambassador in Bonn, on  he was coaccreditated in Bern.

References

1902 births
1981 deaths
Helgi Pálson Briem
Helgi Pálson Briem
Grand Crosses with Star and Sash of the Order of Merit of the Federal Republic of Germany
Commercial attachés